Mr. Jones  is a 1993 American romantic drama film directed by Mike Figgis, and starring Richard Gere, Lena Olin, Anne Bancroft, Tom Irwin and Delroy Lindo.

Plot 
Mr. Jones (Richard Gere), a charismatic and dynamic man, talks his way into a job on a construction site, only to have a manic episode and come close to jumping off a building claiming he can fly. Saved from jumping by fellow construction worker Howard (Delroy Lindo), he is transported to a psychiatric hospital.

Jones is misdiagnosed as schizophrenic, medicated, and released due to lack of space related to budget cuts at the hospital run by Dr. Catherine Holland (Anne Bancroft). After Jones charms Dr. Elizabeth "Libbie" Bowen (Lena Olin) as he checks out, she takes an interest in his case as she struggles with her divorce and other patients.

While in the midst of another manic episode, Jones impulsively spends large amounts of money on a date and jumps up onto the stage during a concert performance of Beethoven’s ninth and starts conducting. Arrested, sent back to the hospital, and diagnosed correctly by Dr. Bowen as having bipolar disorder, he reveals to Bowen and her colleague Dr. Patrick Shaye (Tom Irwin) that he has been in and out of hospitals for 20 years but always refuses treatment for his condition.

Bowen tries to have Jones involuntarily committed for treatment, but benefiting from manic energy Jones is charming and rational during a competency hearing. He apologizes for the incidents at the concert and construction site and challenges Bowen’s diagnosis because she has never seen him in a depressive cycle. He is released.

Bowen gives Jones a ride home from the hearing and he flirts with her while she tries to get more info from him about his illness. Jones reveals he resists treatment because he enjoys the benefits of his mania and despite Bowen’s efforts to convince him, he stops taking his prescribed lithium. Howard, who meets Jones again and is worried about him despite his cheerful and friendly mood, contacts Bowen who discovers Jones severely depressed at his apartment. She helps him check into her hospital.

Bowen begins helping Jones with psychotherapy and he starts to open up. Howard visits Jones and they become friends. Jones rescues Bowen during a violent attack by a patient and they strengthen their bond as she comforts him while he struggles with missing the benefits of his mania while on medication and life at the hospital.

As attraction between Jones and Bowen grows, she contacts his ex-girlfriend. Furious at the invasion of his privacy, Jones tries to leave the hospital but Bowen follows him, confesses her feelings for him and they sleep together.

Feeling guilty about the inappropriate relationship, Bowen confesses to Shaye and he insists she stop treating Jones and seeing him at all. Jones is transferred to another hospital but soon checks himself out. Upset over this and the suicide of another one of her patients, Amanda Chang (Lauren Tom), Bowen quits her job.

Jones shows up at Howard’s house. Howard deduces that Jones is having another manic episode and contacts Bowen when Jones takes off towards the construction site where he previously tried to jump off the building. This time Jones is able to calm himself just as Bowen shows up. With Bowen's help Jones has finally accepted the need to treat his condition and the two happily reconcile.

Cast 
Richard Gere as Mr. Jones
Lena Olin as Dr. Elizabeth "Libbie" Bowen
Anne Bancroft as Dr. Catherine Holland
Tom Irwin as Dr. Patrick Shaye
Delroy Lindo as Howard
Lauren Tom as Amanda Chang
Bruce Altman as David
Lisa Malkiewicz as Susan
Albert Henderson as Patient
Thomas Kopache as Mr. Wilson
Peter Jurasik as Dr. Rosen
Anna Maria Horsford as Judge Harris
Kelli Williams as Kelli
Sal Lopez as Henry
Scott Thomson as Conrad
Bill Moseley as Worker
Thomas Mikal Ford as Arnie / Violent Patient
Lela Ivey as Lisa
Valente Rodriguez as Orderly
David Brisbin as Mr. Warner
Dana Lee as Mr. Chang
Irene Tsu as Mrs. Chang
Kathy Kinney as Homeless Lady
Annie McEnroe as Crying Woman
John Durbin as Patient
Lucinda Jenney as Christine
Taylor Negron as Motorcycle Man
Sheryl Lee as June (uncredited)
Bill Pullman as Construction Site Foreman (uncredited)

Production 
To prepare for the film, Richard Gere, Mike Figgis and Eric Roth did a tremendous amount of research and studying on bipolar disorder. Gere met with several people who have the disorder to gain insight and knowledge on what to accurately portray.
There is a shorter director's cut that Figgis presented at the Munich film festival in 2006.

Michelle Pfeiffer gave up the female lead to take on the part of Catwoman in Batman Returns.

Although it was not released until 1993, most of the filming began to took place in November 1991 and was entirely finished in early 1992.

Reception 
The film was released to mixed reviews; movie historian Leonard Maltin remarked that "Gere is fine, but his onscreen behavior turns this into The Jester of Tides." Indeed, Gere received praise for his performance as the troubled title character. Roger Ebert noted that the film would have been better if the romance plot between Jones and Libbie was left out, since it appeared forced and contrived.

The movie debuted at No. 7 at the box office. Rotten Tomatoes reported that 43% of critics have given the film a positive review based on 14 reviews, with an average rating of 5.20/10. On Metacritic, the film has a weighted average score of 47 out of 100 based on 24 critic reviews, indicating "mixed or average reviews". Audiences polled by CinemaScore gave the film an average grade of "B−" on an A+ to F scale.

References

External links
 
 
 

1993 films
1993 romantic drama films
American romantic drama films
Films about bipolar disorder
Films directed by Mike Figgis
Films shot in San Diego
TriStar Pictures films
Films with screenplays by Eric Roth
Films with screenplays by Michael Cristofer
Films scored by Maurice Jarre
1990s English-language films
1990s American films